Ion cyclotron resonance is a phenomenon related to the movement of ions in a magnetic field. It is used for accelerating ions in a cyclotron, and for measuring the masses of an ionized analyte in mass spectrometry, particularly with Fourier transform ion cyclotron resonance mass spectrometers. It can also be used to follow the kinetics of chemical reactions in a dilute gas mixture, provided these involve charged species.

Definition of the resonant frequency
An ion in a static and uniform magnetic field will move in a circle due to the Lorentz force. The angular frequency of this cyclotron motion for a given magnetic field strength B is given by

where z is the number of positive or negative charges of the ion, e is the elementary charge and m is the mass of the ion. An electric excitation signal having a frequency f will therefore resonate with ions having a mass-to-charge ratio m/z given by

The circular motion may be superimposed with a uniform axial motion, resulting in a helix, or with a uniform motion perpendicular to the field (e.g., in the presence of an electrical or gravitational field) resulting in a cycloid.

Ion cyclotron resonance heating 

Ion cyclotron resonance heating (or ICRH) is a technique in which electromagnetic waves with frequencies corresponding to the ion cyclotron frequency is used to heat up a plasma. The ions in the plasma absorb the electromagnetic radiation and as a result of this, increase in kinetic energy. This technique is commonly used in the heating of tokamak plasmas.

In the solar wind 
On March 8, 2013, NASA released an article according to which ion cyclotron waves were identified by its solar probe spacecraft called WIND as the main cause for the heating of the solar wind as it rises from the sun's surface. Before this discovery, it was unclear why the solar wind particles would heat up instead of cool down, when speeding away from the sun's surface.

See also
Cyclotron resonance
Electron cyclotron resonance

References

Condensed matter physics
Electric and magnetic fields in matter
Ion source
Scientific techniques
Plasma physics